Ando or Andō is a Japanese surname.

Ando may also refer to:

Geography
Ando, Nara, Japan
Ando, Togo
Amdo, traditional Tibetan province (alternative transliteration)
Ando, Chinese Korean transliteration name of Antu County
Ando, New South Wales, a rural hamlet in New South Wales, Australia
Ando, an islet and the approximately coterminous ri located in Yeosu, South Jeolla Province, South Korea

People with the given name
 Ando Kiviberg (born 1969), Estonian musician and politician
 Ando Leps (born 1935), Estonian jurist and politician
 Ando Meritee (born 1974), Estonian renju player

Other uses
Ando (mobile app), a food delivery app
Ando Media, a company that provides digital content services for Internet radio stations
Ando, a letter in the  artificial Tengwar script
"Andó", a song by Juana Molina from Halo

Estonian masculine given names